Sardopaladilhia is a genus of very small aquatic snails, operculate gastropod mollusks in the family Moitessieriidae.

Species
Species within the genus Sardopaladilhia include:
 Sardopaladilhia buccina Rolán & Martínez-Ortí, 2003
 Sardopaladilhia distorta Rolán & Martínez-Ortí, 2003
 Sardopaladilhia marianae Rolán & Martínez-Ortí, 2003
 Sardopaladilhia plagigeyerica Manganelli, Bodon, Cianfanelli, Talenti & Giusti, 1998
 Sardopaladilhia subdistorta Rolán & Martínez-Ortí, 2003

References

Gastropod genera
Moitessieriidae